César Jiménez may refer to:

César Jiménez (diver) (born 1959), Dominican diver
César Tiberio Jiménez (born 1969), Mexican racing driver
César Jiménez (footballer) (born 1977), Spanish footballer
César Jiménez (baseball) (born 1984), Venezuelan baseball player